Iva microcephala, the piedmont marsh elder, is a North American species of flowering plants in the family Asteraceae. It grows in the southeastern United States in Alabama, Florida, Georgia, and the Carolinas.

Iva microcephala is a wind-pollinated annual herb sometimes as much as 100 cm (40 inches) in height. Leaves are very narrow, sometimes thread-like, up to 6 cm (2.4 inches) long. Flower heads are small, clustered in elongated arrays at the tips of branches, each head containing only about 5-8 flowers.

References

microcephala
Flora of the Southeastern United States
Plants described in 1840
Flora without expected TNC conservation status